Gregory Hoyt Truitt (born December 8, 1965 in Sarasota, Florida) is a former American football long snapper in the National Football League. He was signed by the Cincinnati Bengals as an undrafted free agent in 1994. He played college football at Penn State.

1965 births
Living people
American football long snappers
American football centers
Penn State Nittany Lions football players
Cincinnati Bengals players